Peter Zipfel (born 20 October 1956 in Freiburg, Baden-Württemberg) was a West German cross-country skier who competed from 1976 to 1984. His best finish at the Winter Olympics was fourth in the 4 x 10 km relay at Lake Placid, New York in 1980.

Zipfel was also 15 km national champion three times (1976, 1977, 1981).

References
Wallenchinsky, David. (1984). The Complete Book of the Olympics: 1896-1980, New York: Penguin Books. p. 617.

External links
German national champions in men's cross country skiing: 1936-2004 

1956 births
Living people
Sportspeople from Freiburg im Breisgau
German male cross-country skiers
Olympic cross-country skiers of West Germany
Cross-country skiers at the 1980 Winter Olympics
Cross-country skiers at the 1984 Winter Olympics